The Atlantic Theatre Festival (ATF) was a professional theatre company located in Wolfville, Nova Scotia, Canada. The Theatre Festival presented a "broad range of critically acclaimed theatre classics" during the summer in Wolfville's Festival Theatre, the former town hockey arena that was converted into a 504 seat, thrust stage theatre and professional production facility by the Atlantic Theatre Festival Society (a non-profit charity).

History
Over two million dollars was contributed by the local, Nova Scotian, and Canadian governments to create the Festival Theatre. Stratford Festival veteran Michael Langham was among the directors who brought national acclaim to the festival during the Founder's Season of 1995. The reputation of the festival grew over the following seasons as it attracted the likes of Megan Follows, Christopher Plummer, and area native Peter Donat to join its company. In later years, despite originally being conceived as a classical repertory, the festival maintained its critical success as it began to include works by Canadian playwrights as well as family-friendly musicals.

Despite a strong critical reputation, mounting debts over the first five years forced the Atlantic Theatre Festival to reduce cast sizes, lay-off crew, and cancel productions. The construction of the Festival Theatre initially came as a result of a twenty-year (dollar-a-year) lease from Acadia University. In 2002, this agreement was terminated and a new lease was offered that reduced the professional theatre company to a seasonal tenant. This arrangement threatened the Atlantic Theatre Festival's existence, causing the cancellation of the 2004 season. The festival theatre stage remained dark in 2005, but had a successful renewal in 2006. With one main stage production and comedic readings to form the "Summer of Laughter" season both audiences and tourists returned. The financial success did not continue the following season as the festival returned to a multi-play format. In August 2007, artistic director Nigel Bennett was forced to resign mid-season after the Board of Directors informed him that sufficient funds were not available to continue. One production completed its run while two others, one on stage and the other in rehearsal, were cancelled. A lack of funding from both provincial and federal levels was named as the main cause of the closure.

Currently, the Festival Theatre is used for the Acadia University Performing Arts Series, which are held throughout the University school year, and for conferences.

Artistic Directors
Nigel Bennett (2006–2007)
Jerry Etienne (1999–2004)
Michael Bawtree (1995–1998)

Production history
2007

 Shirley Valentine by Willy Russell
 The Drawer Boy by Michael Healey
 A Midsummer Night's Dream by William Shakespeare (Unstaged; season cancelled during rehearsal process)

2006
 Noises Off by Michael Frayn

2003
 Into the Woods by Stephen Sondheim and James Lapine
 Blithe Spirit by Noël Coward
 Three Sisters by Anton Chekhov
2002
 Charley's Aunt by Brandon Thomas
 The Taming of the Shrew by William Shakespeare
 The Miracle Worker by William Gibson
2001
 The Hobbit adapted by Kim Selody
 A Streetcar Named Desire by Tennessee Williams
 Billy Bishop Goes to War by John Gray and Eric Peterson
2000
 Amadeus by Peter Shaffer
 High Notes: A Musical Revue by Jerry Etienne
 Private Lives by Noël Coward
 Macbeth by William Shakespeare
 Billy Bishop Goes to War by John Gray and Eric Peterson
1999
 Hedda Gabler by Henrik Ibsen
 The Constant Wife by W. Somerset Maugham
 The Boar Hog and  The Pregnant Pause by Georges Feydeau
1998
 Othello by William Shakespeare
 Pygmalion by George Bernard Shaw
 The Matchmaker by Thornton Wilder
 Sam Slick Goes Ahead by Andrew Gillis

1997
 Tartuffe by Molière
 The Importance of Being Earnest by Oscar Wilde
 Uncle Vanya by Anton Chekhov

1996
 Twelfth Night by William Shakespeare
 She Stoops to Conquer by Oliver Goldsmith
 A Doll's House by Henrik Ibsen

1995
 The Tempest by William Shakespeare
 The Cherry Orchard by Anton Chekhov
 A Flea in Her Ear by Georges Feydeau

References

Atlantic Theatre Festival 14 December 2006. 5 March 2007. <https://web.archive.org/web/20050127070720/http://atf.ns.ca/>

Theatre festivals in Nova Scotia
Shakespeare festivals in Canada
Acadia University
Buildings and structures in Kings County, Nova Scotia
Theatre companies in Nova Scotia